Hilary Hinton Ziglar (November 6, 1926 – November 28, 2012) was an American author, salesman, and motivational speaker.

Biography

Early life and education 
Zig Ziglar was born prematurely in Coffee County, Alabama, to John Silas Ziglar and Lila Wescott Ziglar. He was the tenth of 12 children, and the youngest boy.

In 1931, when Ziglar was five years old, his father took a management position at a Mississippi farm, and his family moved to Yazoo City, Mississippi, where he spent most of his early childhood. The next year, his father died of a stroke, and his younger sister died two days later.

Between 1943 and 1945, he participated in the Navy V-12 Navy College Training Program at the University of South Carolina in Columbia, South Carolina.

Career 

Ziglar dropped out of college in 1947 and moved to Lancaster, South Carolina, where he took up a job as a salesman with the WearEver Cookware company. Ziglar was promoted to field manager and eventually divisional supervisor in 1950.

While working at the company, Ziglar became interested in self-help and motivational speaking and began giving speeches of his own. With Richard "Dick" Gardner and Hal Krause, Ziglar was a charter member in the establishment of American Salesmasters in 1963. The company's objective was to raise the image of salespeople in America by providing seminars. They began with cities across the South and Midwest (Memphis, Atlanta, Kansas City, St. Louis, Chicago, Denver, etc.), featuring speakers such as Ziglar, Norman Vincent Peale, Ken McFarland, Cavett Robert, Bill Gove, Maxwell Maltz, and Red Motley. They booked an auditorium, put together a slate of speakers and contacted local businesses to sell tickets. Audiences included insurance agents, car salesmen, financial advisors, entrepreneurs, small business owners and curiosity seekers.

Ziglar went on to speak extensively for audiences of the National Association of Sales Education (NASE), founded by Dick Gardner in 1965, and also became a major sales trainer for Mary Kay Cosmetics. In 1968, he became a vice president and training director for the Automotive Performance Company and moved to Dallas, Texas. The company went bankrupt two years later.

He later founded the Zigmanship Institute, later known as Ziglar, Inc. Subsequently, Ziglar spoke extensively at seminars for motivational speaker Peter Lowe and eventually signed an exclusive agreement to support Peter Lowe events.

In addition to speaking, Ziglar wrote over 30 books.

In Addison, Texas, Ziglar employed and trained several speakers, including Will Harris.

In 2007, a fall down a flight of stairs left him with short-term memory problems. Nonetheless, Ziglar continued taking part in motivational seminars until he retired in 2010.

Personal life 
Ziglar met his wife, Jean, in 1944, in Jackson, Mississippi. He was 17 and she was 16; they married in late 1946. They had four children: Suzan, Tom, Cindy, and Julie.

Ziglar, a Baptist, integrated Christianity into his motivational work. He was also a Republican who endorsed former Governor of Arkansas Mike Huckabee for his party's presidential nomination in 2008.

Death 
On November 28, 2012, Ziglar died from pneumonia at a hospital in Plano, Texas.

Books 
 Ziglar, Zig (1974). Biscuits, Fleas & Pump Handles: Zig Ziglar's Key to "More".  Dallas: Crescendo Publications. .

 
 
 
 
 
 

 
 
 
 
 Ziglar, Zig (2004). Courtship After Marriage: Romance Can Last a Lifetime. Nashville: Thomas Nelson Publishers. .

References

External links 

1926 births
2012 deaths
American evangelicals
United States Navy personnel of World War II
American motivational speakers
American motivational writers
American self-help writers
Baptists from Texas
Business speakers
Hinds Community College alumni
People from Coffee County, Alabama
People associated with direct selling
Writers from Dallas
People from Plano, Texas
People from Yazoo City, Mississippi
Prosperity theologians
American salespeople
Texas Republicans
United States Navy sailors
University of South Carolina alumni
Deaths from pneumonia in Texas
Baptists from Mississippi
Baptists from Alabama
20th-century Baptists
21st-century Baptists